The women's 3000 metres steeplechase at the 2015 Southeast Asian Games was held in National Stadium, Singapore. The track and field events took place on June 12.

Schedule
All times are (UTC+08:00)

Records

Results 
Legend
SB — Seasonal Best
PB — Personal Best
NR — National Record

References

Athletics at the 2015 Southeast Asian Games
Women's sports competitions in Singapore
2015 in women's athletics